Changbu is a town in Anyi County, Jiangxi, China. , it comprises one residential community and 9 villages under its administration.

References

Township-level divisions of Jiangxi
Anyi County